The 2018 Hastings Deering Colts season was the 1st season of the under-20 competition, sponsored by Hastings Deering and run by the Queensland Rugby League. Replacing the National Rugby League's National Youth Competition, the draw and structure of the competition mirrored that of its senior counterpart, the Queensland Cup.

Norths Devils were the inaugural premiers, defeating the Townsville Blackhawks in the Grand Final.

Teams
The inaugural season of the Hastings Deering Colts featured 15 teams, thirteen based in Queensland, one in northern New South Wales and one in Victoria. 13 Queensland Cup teams fielded a side in the competition, with the two unaffiliated clubs being the Victoria Thunderbolts and Western Mustangs. Like their senior counterparts, each team was also affiliated with an NRL club.

Regular season

Bold – Opposition's Home game
X – Bye
Opponent for round listed above margin

Ladder

Final series

Grand Final

Player statistics
The following statistics are correct as of the conclusion of Round 24.

Leading try scorers

Leading point scorers

References

2018 in Australian rugby league